was a  after Kōshō and before Kanshō. This period spanned the years from September 1457 through December 1460.

Change of era
 1457 : The era name was changed to mark an event or a number of events. The old era ended and a new one commenced in Kōshō 3.

Events of the Chōroku era
 1457 (Chōroku 1): Tarō Sayemon attempted to retrieve the Sacred Jewel for Emperor Go-Hanazono; and he actually did manage to gain possession of it for a brief time. A counterattack prevented the success of this dangerous mission in Yoshino. In 1443 (Kakitsu 3, 23rd day of the 9th month), an armed group of rebels penetrated the palace defenses. A fire was started and one of the men sought to kill Emperor Go-Hanazono, but the emperor escaped. However, the intruders managed to steal the Sacred Treasures – the mirror, the sword and the jewel. Later, a guard found the mirror and a priest found the sword, but the location of jewel was not known until the 8th month of Bunnan gannen.
 1458 (Chōroku 2, 8th month):  The Sacred Jewel is retrieved from the former Southern Court. It is returned to Kyoto to join the other Sacred Treasures which comprise the Imperial Regalia of Japan.
 1459''' (Chōroku 3): Shōgun Ashikaga Yoshimasa provided a new mikoshi and a complete set of robes and other accouterments for this festival on the occasion of repairs to the Atsuta Shrine in the 1457-1459 (Chōroku 1-3).

Notes

References
 Nussbaum, Louis Frédéric and Käthe Roth. (2005). Japan Encyclopedia. Cambridge: Harvard University Press. ; OCLC 48943301
 Ponsonby-Fane, Richard Arthur Brabazon. (1959). The Imperial House of Japan. Kyoto: Ponsonby Memorial Society. OCLC 194887
 . (1962). Studies in Shinto and Shrines. Kyoto: Ponsonby Memorial Society. OCLC 3994492
 Titsingh, Isaac. (1834). Nihon Odai Ichiran''; ou,  Annales des empereurs du Japon.  Paris: Royal Asiatic Society, Oriental Translation Fund of Great Britain and Ireland. OCLC 5850691.

External links
 National Diet Library, "The Japanese Calendar" -- historical overview plus illustrative images from library's collection

Japanese eras
1450s in Japan
1460s in Japan